Brithenig, or also known as Comroig, is an invented language, or constructed language ("conlang"). It was created as a hobby in 1996 by Andrew Smith from New Zealand, who also invented the alternate history of Ill Bethisad to "explain" it. Officially according to the Ill Bethisad Wiki,  Brithenig is classified as a Britanno-Romance language, along with other Romance languages that displaced Celtic.

Brithenig was not developed to be used in the real world, like Esperanto or Interlingua, or to provide detail to a work of fiction, like Klingon from the Star Trek franchise. Rather, Brithenig started as a thought experiment to create a Romance language that might have evolved if Latin had displaced the native Celtic language as the spoken language of the people in Great Britain.

The result is an artificial sister language to French, Catalan, Spanish, Portuguese, Romanian, Occitan and Italian which differs from them by having sound-changes similar to those that affected Welsh, and words that are borrowed from the Brittonic languages and from English throughout its pseudo-history. One important distinction between Brithenig and Welsh is that Welsh is P-Celtic, but Latin was a Q-Italic language (as opposed to P-Italic, like Oscan), and the trait was passed onto Brithenig.

It has also inspired Wessisc, a hypothetical Germanic language influenced by contact with Old Celtic.

Brithenig was granted the code BZT as part of ISO 639-3.

Andrew Smith was one of the conlangers featured in the exhibit "Esperanto, Elvish, and Beyond: The World of Constructed Languages" displayed at the Cleveland Public Library from May through August 2008. Smith's creation of Brithenig was cited as the reason for his inclusion in the exhibit (which also included the Babel Text in Smith's language).

Orthography 

Brithenig orthography are similar to that of Welsh, except:
 Brithenig also use such phonemes finally in letters c and g.
 Hard G in Brithenig is indicated by gh as in Italian.
 Similarly, when preceding e and i, sc is pronounced , otherwise .
 The letter k used for hard  is much more alive in Brithenig than Welsh.
 While Welsh words are usually stressed in penultimate syllables, Brithenig words are stressed in the last syllable (Brithenig yscol vs. Welsh ysgol, both mean "school").
 There are no complicated rules on predicting vowel length from orthography: stressed vowels are always pronounced long.
 Brithenig has numerous silent letters.
 In words more than two syllables, word-final -t in the sequence -nt, and -r or -l as the second members of consonant clusters become silent.
 Word-final -f generally silent, but not as an orthographically geminate -ff.
 In the infinitive endings -ar, -er, -ir, the -r is usually unpronounced.
 Monosyllabic words ending in consonant clusters which ends in -r or -l are pronounced with an epenthetic vowel same as the last vowel (llifr pronounced as llifir , see above). Such would account for unusual stress patterns.

Grammar

Mutation 
Like Welsh and other Celtic languages, initial consonant mutations (cluinediwn, lit. "declensions") in Brithenig is an important feature. There are three mutations: soft (moillad), spirant (solwed), and nasal (naral).

Soft mutation are used with feminine nouns, adjectives, verbs, change in word order, after an adverb, and prepositions di "of, from" and gwo "under". Spirant mutation are used for marking plurals on nouns, adjective, and verbs, but also after prepositions tra "through" and a "to, at", and the conjunction mai "but". Nasal mutation are used after the negative adverb used to negate verbs rhen, and prepositions in "in" and cun "with".

Before a vowel, the prepositions a "to, at" and e "and" irregularly became a-dd and e-dd.

Nouns and adjectives 
Gender in Brithenig nouns is lexical and unpredictable, as it obscured by historic sound changes. The indefinite article in Brithenig is ynx "one".

Unlike Welsh with unpredictably-formed plurals, there is no dedicated separate plural suffix for Brithenig, thus, the singular and plural forms are almost always invariable (similar to transnumeral languages such as Indonesian and Korean). Instead, the plural definite article is generally placed before the noun (lla gas, llo chas), but yet there are some exceptions to this rule. Exceptions include the plural of (ill) of "man", (llo) h-on; and some plurals that formed by placing feminine singular definite article before it with spirant lenition (ill bordd, lla fordd).

Dual forms of natural pairs (e.g. arms, legs), however, have their own prefix and formed by prefixing dew- "two" to the nouns. The similar feature also occurs in Breton. Diminutives and augmentatives are derived by suffixing -ith (usual)/-in (affection/collective) and -un, respectively.

Pronouns 

There is no distinction of numbers in third person, but can be indicated by spirant lenition on succeeding nominals or verbs (before singulars the mutation is not used). Unlike nouns, pronouns are not just inflected for numbers, but also grammatical cases. Like many languages, there are T–V distinction, with ty is used for addressing people that the speaker is familiar with or gods, while Gw is used when speaking to a stranger or a less familiar or more formal acquaintance (with capitals). Before feminine nouns, the succeeding noun(s) exhibit soft mutation, while before plural the noun(s) exhibit spirant mutation. When mutated, ty and ti irregularly becomes dyx to avoid confusion with di "of". Unlike Welsh, Brithenig make fewer use of inflected prepositions, and such prepositions only found in the word cun "with":

Verbs 
Similar to Spanish and Portuguese, Brithenig verbs are divided into 3 conjugations according to their infinitive endings: -ar (canhar "to sing"), -er (perdder "to lose"), and -ir (dorfir "to sleep") (note that the final -r are usually silent). Brithenig is a non-null-subject language, that is, it requires pronouns before the verb forms (ys cant "he sings"). Note that the stem's final consonants also undergo lenition, but also unvoiced final stop consonants become voiced in the imperfect, past definite, and subjunctive past plurals; future, and conditional forms (that in verbs like canhar those also undergo mutation as well).

Subjunctive forms nowadays only survive in fixed phrases, like can in Rhufein, ffâ si llo Rhufan ffeigant "when in Rome, do as the Romans do". Also in subjunctive present forms, final vowels are affected by i-affection (except in -ar verbs where it only happen in plural forms):

Regular verbs

Irregular verbs 
While the Brithenig conjugation is mostly regular, there are some irregular verbs. In past definite tense, some verbs have s-stem preterite originating from Latin perfect tenses in -x- or -s- (eo ddis from diger "to say" for example):

In past participles, instead of regular forms, some verbs have irregular participles inherited from Latin supines in -tum (facere, factum → fager, faeth "to do"), -sum (claudere, clausum → clodder, clos "to close"), or even combinations of them (vidēre, *vistum → gwidder, gwist "to see"). Some verbs also have irregular imperative forms, either by lengthening the last vowel and deleting last consonant (only in the case of familiar imperatives, diger, dî, digeth), or taking forms from subjunctive (saber, seib, seibeth). The verb gweddir "to go", where it comes from Latin vadō but it is not suppleted with other verbs, has irregularities in the present tense: eo wa, tu wa, ys wa, sa wa, nu wan, gw wath, ys/sa want.

Most irregular verbs 
Irregular forms are underlined.

Syntax
The default word order in Brithenig is subject–verb–object (SVO), overall syntax is similar to French but unlike Welsh. However, when the verb coexists with an object pronoun the word order changes to subject–object–verb. The word order for yes-no questions is verb–subject–object (gw pharolath Brithenig "you speak Brithenig" vs. parola'gw Frithenig? "are you speaking Brithenig?").

Vocabulary 
Most of Brithenig's vocabulary is distinctively Romance even though it is disguised as Welsh. This list of 30 words gives an impression of what Brithenig looks like in comparison to nine other Romance languages, including Wenedyk, and to Welsh. The similarity of about one quarter of the Welsh words to Brithenig words (indicated by not being bracketed) is because of their common Indo-European background, but a few others, such as ysgol, were borrowings from Latin into Welsh.

Example
The Lord's Prayer:

Notes

References

External links
  
 
 
 The corresponding page in Ill Bethisad Wiki

Artistic languages
Ill Bethisad

Constructed languages introduced in the 1990s
1996 introductions
Thought experiments
Constructed languages
Romance languages